The 2019 FIBA U18 Women's European Championship Division C was the 14th edition of the Division C of the FIBA U18 Women's European Championship, the third tier of the European women's under-18 basketball championship. It was played in Andorra la Vella, Andorra, from 30 July to 4 August 2019. Armenia women's national under-18 basketball team won the tournament and Kayla Keshmeshian was named the tournaments MVP.

Participating teams

  (24th place, 2018 FIBA U18 Women's European Championship Division B)

First round

Group A

Group B

5th–7th place classification

Group C

Championship playoffs

Semifinals

3rd place match

Final

Final standings

References

External links
FIBA official website

2019
2019–20 in European women's basketball
FIBA U18
August 2019 sports events in Europe
International basketball competitions hosted by Andorra
Sports competitions in Andorra la Vella